Sir Ralph Lilley Turner  (5 October 1888 – 22 April 1983) was a British philologist of Indian languages and a university administrator. He is notable for composing an Indo-Aryan comparative dictionary. He is also the author of some publications concerning the Romani language.

Early life and education
Turner was born in Charlton, London, the son of Bertha (Lilley) and George S. Turner. He was educated at the Perse School and Christ's College, Cambridge.

Career
In 1913, he joined the Indian Educational Service as a lecturer at Queen's College, Benares. From 1915 to 1919, he served with the 2nd battalion, 3rd Queen Alexandra's Own Gurkha Rifles in the British Indian Army during World War I, winning the Military Cross in Palestine. From 1920 to 1922, he was Professor of Indian Linguistics at Benares Hindu University.

In 1922, Turner returned to England as Professor of Sanskrit at the School of Oriental Studies at the University of London. Between 1924 and 1932, he also published several papers on Romani Studies in the Journal of the Gypsy Lore Society, including "On the position of Romani in Indo-Aryan" (1927). He was director of the school from 1937 to 1957, although he continued to occupy his chair as well until 1954. From 1939 onwards he frequently warned the War Office that given the possibility of war with Japan it was essential to start training linguists immediately, but his warnings were ignored. It was only after the outbreak of war with Japan that, early in 1942, the War Office and the Board of Education put together a plan with SOAS for short courses in Japanese to meet wartime demands.

He was knighted in 1950. His magnum opus, the Comparative Dictionary of the Indo-Aryan languages was published in 1966.

The British memorial in London to the Gurkhas was unveiled by Queen Elizabeth II on 3 December 1997. The legend on the Gurkha memorial is taken from the following quotation written by Sir Ralph:

Personal life
He was married to Dorothy Rivers Goulty. One of his grandchildren is Professor Geoffrey L. Smith, head of the Department of Pathology at the University of Cambridge.

Another grandchild of Sir Ralph Turner is David Tee, who is in the current England 45+ indoor cricket team. Earlier in his career he had a successful few years for Hertfordshire, and toured the West Indies representing Great British colleges.

Through his daughter, Kathleen L. Turner, one of his great-grandchildren is actor Jeremy Irvine.

References
Dictionary of National Biography
Obituary: Sir Ralph Lilley Turner, Wright, J.C. & Cowan, C.D. (1984) Bulletin of the School of Oriental and African Studies. University of London. Vol. 47, No. 3. pp. 540–548.

Works
A Comparative and Etymological Dictionary of the Nepali Language
A Comparative Dictionary of the Indo-Aryan Languages

Archives
 Papers of Ralph Turner are held by SOAS Special Collections

References

1888 births
1983 deaths
People from Charlton, London
People educated at The Perse School
Alumni of Christ's College, Cambridge
English orientalists
English philologists
Knights Bachelor
Academics of SOAS University of London
British Indian Army officers
Recipients of the Military Cross
Indian Army personnel of World War I
Fellows of Christ's College, Cambridge
Presidents of the Royal Asiatic Society